Hamidabad (also Romanized as Ḩamīdābād; also known as Mamīdābād and Shahrak-e Shohadā) is a village in Hoseynabad Rural District, in the Central District of Shush County, Khuzestan Province, Iran. At the 2006 census, its population was 573, in 109 families.

References 

Populated places in Shush County